Štore is a town in eastern Slovenia. It is the seat of the Municipality of Štore. It lies on the Voglajna River, just east of Celje. The area is part of the traditional region of Styria. The municipality is now included in the Savinja Statistical Region.

Name
The name Štore is probably originally an accusative plural derived from the Slovene common noun štor 'stump', referring to an area where stumps remained after it was cleared.

History
Until the Second World War, Štore was a hamlet of the village of Kresnike (today Kresnike is a hamlet of Štore). The town only developed in the mid-19th century, when the ironworks were established in the area after coal was found in the surrounding hills.

References

External links

 Štore on Geopedia

Populated places in the Municipality of Štore